Yeni Dergi (Turkish: The New Magazine) was a monthly cultural magazine which was published in Istanbul, Turkey, between 1964 and 1975. The magazine featured both translations and original texts from different fields.

History and profile
Yeni Dergi was first published in October 1964. The publisher was De Publications which was owned by Memet Fuat, a Turkish author, and the stated aim of the magazine to enrich the knowledge base of the Turkish intellectuals. Memet Fuat was also the editor-in-chief of the magazine which mostly featured translations of the contemporary critical theory from the Western sources. Such texts were about philosophy, aesthetics, politics, psychology and literature. The most frequent topics covered were existentialism and Marxist criticism. From 1969 Yeni Dergi contained less translated texts, and focused on original Turkish works. 

The magazine folded in 1975 after publishing a total of one hundred twenty-eight issue.

References

1964 establishments in Turkey
1975 disestablishments in Turkey
Cultural magazines published in Turkey
Defunct magazines published in Turkey
Literary translation magazines
Magazines established in 1964
Magazines disestablished in 1975
Magazines published in Istanbul
Monthly magazines published in Turkey
Turkish-language magazines